The  is an agency established under the Ministry of Defense that handles project management, technology management, research and development, and procurement of defense equipment for the Japan Self-Defense Forces. ATLA's formation is also seen as part of Prime Minister Shinzō Abe defense policy to bolster the military by streamlining and reforming Japan's defense industry and equipment acquisition.

History 
In 2014, the Ministry of Defense began to implement reforms to adapt to the increasing tensions in security environment surrounding Japan and the changes in defense policy under Prime Minister Shinzō Abe. As part of the Medium Term Defense Program (FY 2014-2018) the Ministry of Defense pursued organizational restructuring, which includes the integration of all departments that handles equipment acquisition into one agency. The Ministry of Defense included the reforms in the FY2015 defense budget; which included the establishment of ATLA and reorganization of the Internal Bureau to accompany with ATLA's establishment. ATLA's formation involved integrating any divisions related to procurement or research and development from other departments into one bureau. These departments include the Internal Bureau's Bureau of Finance & Equipment, Staff Offices, Technical Research and Development Institute (TRDI), and Equipment Procurement and Construction Office.

ATLA was formed on October 1, 2015.

ATLA manages the research and development and procurement of military technology for Japan, through by collaborations with universities, or domestic/international industry companies.

Active projects

Aerial systems 
 UH-X helicopter
 I3 fighter
 UAV
 Scramjet
F-X fighter

Ground systems 
 Light-weight Combat Vehicle System
 Replacement for Type 96 Armored Personnel Carrier
 Amphibious Obstacle Clearance System (Mine Clearance System)
 Future Amphibious Technology
 EMP ammunition
 Railguns
 Active protection system
 Counter-IED systems
 Hybrid Propulsion Systems
 Future Light-weight Bridge
 Advanced Anti-surface Warhead Technology
 Remote Controlled Engineering Vehicle System for CBRN Threats

Naval systems 
 Unmanned underwater vehicle

Missile systems 
 Type 03 Chū-SAM Kai
 ASM-3
 Standard Missile-3 Block II A

Electronic systems 
 High Power Laser System
 Radar-IR Combined Sensor System

Others 
 Powered exoskeleton
 Human-robot cooperation technology
 Multipurpose Autonomous Robot Vehicle

Completed projects

Aerial systems 

 Mitsubishi X-2 Shinshin
 Kawasaki C-2
 Kawasaki P-1

Ground systems 

 Type 16 maneuver combat vehicle
 NBC Reconnaissance Vehicle
 Type 19 155 mm Wheeled Self-propelled Howitzer

Naval systems 

 
 
 
 
 
 Future Multi Purpose Trimaran concept

Missile systems 

 Type 12 Surface-to-Ship Missile
 AAM-5B

References

External links
Official website

Ministry of Defense (Japan)
Government agencies of Japan
Government agencies established in 2015
2015 establishments in Japan